Japanese football in 1995

J.League

Japan Football League

Japanese Regional Leagues

Emperor's Cup

National team (Men)

Results

Players statistics

National team (Women)

Results

Players statistics

External links

 
Seasons in Japanese football